In mathematics, the Stieltjes moment problem, named after Thomas Joannes Stieltjes, seeks necessary and sufficient conditions for a sequence (m0, m1, m2, ...) to be of the form

for some measure μ. If such a function μ exists, one asks whether it is unique.

The essential difference between this and other well-known moment problems is that this is on a half-line [0, ∞), whereas in the Hausdorff moment problem one considers a bounded interval [0, 1], and in the Hamburger moment problem one considers the whole line (−∞, ∞).

Existence
Let

and

and for all larger

Uniqueness

There are several sufficient conditions for uniqueness, for example, Carleman's condition, which states that the solution is unique if

References 

Probability problems
Mathematical analysis
Moment (mathematics)
Mathematical problems